is a Japanese politician who served as Minister for Foreign Affairs in 2011. A native of Tokyo and graduate of the University of Tokyo, he was elected to the House of Representatives for the first time in 2000 after running unsuccessfully as an independent in 1996.

Matsumoto is a great-great-grandson of Itō Hirobumi, the first Prime Minister of Japan. Matsumoto's father, Juro Matsumoto, was a senior member of the Liberal Democratic Party and was the Minister of Defense from August 1989 to February 1990. Matsumoto was selected as Foreign Minister of Japan in 2011 by Prime Minister Naoto Kan, after the resignation of his predecessor, Seiji Maehara, only two days before the March 11 earthquake and tsunami and subsequent Fukushima I nuclear disaster.

In 2015 Matsumoto left the DPJ citing the party's opposition to the 2015 Japanese military legislation and cooperation with the JCP. Before the 2017 elections he joined the Liberal Democratic Party.

In November 2022, Matsumoto was appointed by Prime Minister Fumio Kishida to be Minister for Internal Affairs and Communications, replacing Minoru Terada who had resigned the previous day.

Ancestry

References

External links

 Official website in Japanese.

|-

|-

|-

|-

|-

|-

1959 births
Democratic Party of Japan politicians
Liberal Democratic Party (Japan) politicians
Foreign ministers of Japan
Government ministers of Japan
Living people
Members of the House of Representatives (Japan)
People from Tokyo
University of Tokyo alumni